New Heights Academy Charter School (M353) is a charter school in Harlem, New York City, New York for grades 5 - 12, located at 1818 Amsterdam Avenue. It is within the New York City Department of Education.

The students originate from Harlem, Inwood, and Washington Heights.

New Heights Academy Charter School was founded in 2006 for students in grades 5-12 living in Harlem, Washington Heights and Inwood.  Washington Heights in particular was lacking in high school options for students entering 9th grade, so the opening of New Heights provided these students with the opportunity to attend high school in their own neighborhood.

As of 2011 it was the largest charter school in New York City.

History 

New Heights Academy received its initial charter in 2005.  Committed to locating the school in District 6 where the majority of students and their families live, the founding team delayed opening the school for one year until space was found for the school in District 6.  In 2006 New Heights Academy opened its doors in a landmarked former ribbon factory, 'Fair and Square' Ribbons manufactured by Joseph Loth & Co., to 192 fifth and ninth graders.  Each year New Heights Academy added an additional grade in both middle school and high school, reaching full enrollment of 750 students in 2009.  In June 2010, New Heights held its inaugural high school graduation.  Stacy Winitt is the founder of New Heights Academy Charter School.

Operations 
As of 2015 the school's board of trustees includes representatives of Bingham McCutchen, Goldman Sachs, NRG Energy, PricewaterhouseCoopers, Time Warner, and other major companies. Alan J. Singer, author of Education Flashpoints: Fighting for America’s Schools, stated that the resources given by the board was one of the reasons attributed to the school's "apparent success". Christina Brown is the current Executive Director.

Academics 

Charter schools are public schools which receive public funds though operate independently from local school boards. New Heights Academy is accountable to the SUNY Charter Schools Institute and the charter is up for renewal every three-five years. Students at New Heights Academy are selected through a lottery system and are eligible to begin attending New Heights as fifth graders.  Upon successful completion of middle school requirements, students are promoted to New Heights Academy High School.

New Heights Academy High School has many similarities to other New York City public high schools. Students at New Heights take Regents exams in all of their core subjects.  New Heights also offers Advanced Placement courses, including AP Calculus AB, AP English Language and Composition, AP English Literature and Composition, AP United States History, AP Italian, and AP Psychology.  Students at New Heights, however, follow an extended day schedule, with school beginning at 8:20 am and ending at 4:14 pm (though on Wednesdays students have a half day schedule and staff members have professional development in the afternoon).  All students at New Heights study a college-preparatory curriculum and must successfully complete a 4 year sequence in English, History, Mathematics and Science (most NYC high schools have only a 3 year STEM requirement).

Saturday Academy exists to support students in their core classes, as well as provide additional preparation for Regents and Advanced Placement examinations.  Some students are required to attend the Saturday Academy to get extra help in schoolwork.

Students in grades 9, 10 and 11 have the option to take Japanese language classes. Founder Stacy Winitt stated that the school wants students to be more marketable by knowing more languages, and the school selected Japanese since it is an unfamiliar language to the majority Hispanic student body.

College Preparation 

The college curriculum and preparation differentiates New Heights Academy from most public high schools.  OneGoal, a program focused on college graduation for urban students, is an integral part of Advisory.  The OneGoal curriculum is implemented in all 11th and 12th grade Advisory classes, in which students explore different colleges, learn about the college application process and create their own personal post-secondary path.  The college counselors regularly push in to Advisory classes.  Selected students with GPAs ranging from 75-85 with excellent attendance records receive additional mentorship and support as the designated OneGoal class, beginning in 11th grade and following them through their first year of college.  Teachers with several years of classroom experience and strong relationships with students are selected as OneGoal Program Directors, and they remain with their OneGoal classes for three consecutive years.

All high school students at New Heights go on trips to visit colleges.  In 9th grade students take day trips to visit local CUNY and private colleges, in 10th grade students visit colleges in upstate New York on an overnight trip, and during 11th grade students attend a week long, overnight, out-of-state college trip.  As seniors students receive extensive guidance and support in applying to a total of fifteen CUNYs, SUNYs and private colleges.   100% of New Heights seniors are accepted into college.  Notable colleges students attend include Cornell, Barnard, University of Rochester, Boston University, RIT, Gettysburg, Wheaton, SUNY Stony Brook, SUNY Binghamton and CUNY Hunter College.

Academic Performance 

Circa 2014 NYCDOE school assessment personnel ranked this school an "A" school for the 2010-2011 progress report.

As of circa 2020, 24% performed at grade level in mathematics and 21% performed at or above grade level in reading. The incoming class at that time had a higher reading score than the students already established at New Heights.

The NYCDOE stated that the school's graduation rate was 81% while the school stated that 90% of the original 12th grade class graduated. Singer wrote that the NYCDOE rate was "still very high given the student population." According to City University of New York college tests proctored around 2014, 1.1% of students graduating from New Heights were prepared to do university-level work without remedial classes. Since then this has gone down

Student Body 
As of 2020 about all of the students are Hispanic. 95% of the students qualified for free or reduced lunch, an indicator of low income status.

It had 192 students in 2006 and 760 students by fall 2011.

Athletics 

Athletic offerings abound at New Heights High School, including the following:

 Baseball
 Cheerleading

Extracurricular Activities 

New Heights students can get involved in the following activities:

 Theatre
 Dance Team

External links 
 New Heights Academy Charter School

References 

Charter schools in New York City
Public high schools in Manhattan
Public middle schools in Manhattan
Educational institutions established in 2006
2006 establishments in New York City
Schools in Harlem